Rousseau Creek is a stream in the U.S. state of Georgia. It empties into Lake Strom Thurmond.

Rousseau Creek was named after William Rousseau, a pioneer landholder.

References

Rivers of Georgia (U.S. state)
Rivers of Columbia County, Georgia
Rivers of McDuffie County, Georgia